1-Nonylnaphthalene is a derivative of naphthalene with a nonyl group in the 1-position.

References

1-Naphthyl compounds
Aromatic hydrocarbons